| birth_place             = Jabalpur district
 | death_date              =
 | death_place             =
 | restingplace            =
 | restingplacecoordinates =
 | birthname               =
 | parents                 = Babulal Sonkar (father)
 | citizenship             =
 | nationality             = Indian
 | party                   = Bhartiya Janata Party
 | otherparty              = 
 | education               = B.A. from Kesharvani College, Jabalpur University in 1977
 | spouse                  = 
 | partner                 =
 | relations               =
 | children                = 
 | residence               = Jabalpur district
 | occupation              = Politician
 | profession              = Pensioner
 | cabinet                 =
 | committees              =
 | portfolio               =
 | signature               =
 | signature_alt           =
 | website                 =
 | footnotes               =
 | blank1                  =
 | data1                   =
}}
Anchal Sonkar is an Indian politician and a member of the 2013 Legislative Assembly of India. He represents the Jabalpur Purba constituency of Madhya Pradesh and is a member of the Bhartiya Janata Party political party. He lost re-election in 2018 to Lakhan Ghanghoriya by a margin of over twenty-two percent.

Early life and education 
Anchal Sonkar was born in Jabalpur district. He is educated till B.A. from Kesharvani College, Jabalpur University in 1977.

Political career 
Anchal Sonkar has been a MLA for one term. He represented the Jabalpur constituency and is a member of the Bhartiya Janata Party political party. Jabalpur seat is reserved for SC category.

References

Living people
1960 births
21st-century Indian politicians
Members of the Uttar Pradesh Legislative Assembly
Bharatiya Janata Party politicians from Uttar Pradesh
People from Ambedkar Nagar district